Doolittle is the second studio album by the American alternative rock band Pixies, released in April 1989 on 4AD. Doolittle was the Pixies' first international release, with Elektra Records as the album's distributor in the United States and PolyGram in Canada.

Pixies released two singles from Doolittle: "Here Comes Your Man" and "Monkey Gone to Heaven", both of which were chart successes on the Billboard Modern Rock Tracks chart in the US, while tracks such as "Debaser" and "Hey" have also received praise. The album itself reached number eight on the UK Albums Chart, an unexpected success for the band.

As well as being considered the most accessible Pixies album, Doolittle is often regarded as the band's strongest and greatest work, and has continued to sell consistently well in the years since its release, being certified Gold in 1995 and Platinum in 2018 by the Recording Industry Association of America. The album has been cited as inspirational by many alternative artists, while numerous music publications have ranked it as one of the most influential albums ever. A 2003 poll of NME writers ranked Doolittle as the second-greatest album of all time, Rolling Stone placed the album at 141 on its 2020 list of "The 500 Greatest Albums of All Time" and Pitchfork ranked it as the fourth best album of the 1980s.

The album's offbeat and dark subject matter features references to surrealism, Biblical violence, torture and death.

Background 
Following their highly regarded but commercially unsuccessful 1988 album Surfer Rosa, the band embarked on a European tour with fellow Bostonians Throwing Muses, before beginning a tour of North American states. During this time, Black Francis, the group's frontman and principal songwriter, began to write new material for a future album, with songs such as "Dead", "Hey", "Tame", and "There Goes My Gun" emerging through the course of the year. Versions of the newly composed songs were recorded during several sessions for John Peel's radio show in 1988, while a live recording of "Hey" appeared on a free EP circulated with a 1988 edition of Sounds.

In mid-1988, the Pixies began to record demo sessions while on breaks from touring. The band headed to the Boston recording studio Eden Sound, which at the time comprised a small room in the basement of a hair salon. They recorded at the studio for a week, in circumstances similar to the previous year's Purple Tape sessions. Francis gave the demo tape and upcoming album the provisional title of Whore, though he later claimed his natural father had originally suggested the name. Francis has clarified that he was thinking of the word "in the more traditional sense ... the operatic, biblical sense, ... as in the great whore of Babylon". After completing the demo tape, band manager Ken Goes suggested two producers for the album: Liverpudlian Gil Norton and American Ed Stasium. The band had previously worked with Norton while recording the single version of "Gigantic" in May 1988. Francis had no preference, although Ivo Watts-Russell, head of the band's label 4AD, wanted Norton to produce the next album. Norton was hired as producer, with Stasium not even approached for the position.

Norton arrived in Boston on October 31, 1988, and first visited Francis' apartment to review the album's demos. The two talked about arrangements, and spent two days intensively analyzing the album's songs. Norton learned to gauge Francis's reaction to changing arrangements, and later observed that the frontman "doesn't like to do anything twice". Norton spent a further two weeks in pre-production to familiarize himself with the Pixies' sound.

Recording and production 
Recording sessions for the album began on October 31, 1988, at Downtown Recorders in Boston, Massachusetts, which was at the time a professional 24-track studio. 4AD allotted the Pixies a budget of $40,000, excluding producer's fees. This was a modest sum for a 1980s major label album; however, it quadrupled the amount spent on the band's previous album, Surfer Rosa. Along with Norton, two assistant recording engineers and two second assistants were assigned to the project. The sessions lasted three weeks, concluding on November 23, with "nearly a song a day" being recorded.

Production and mixing began on November 28. The band relocated to Carriage House Studios, a residential studio in Stamford, Connecticut, to oversee production and record further tracks. Norton recruited Steven Haigler as mixing engineer, whom he had worked with at Fort Apache Studios. During production, Haigler and Norton added layers of guitars and vocals to songs, including overdubbed guitars on "Debaser" and double tracked vocals on "Wave of Mutilation". During the recordings, Norton advised Francis to alter several songs; a noted example being "There Goes My Gun", which was originally intended as a much faster, Hüsker Dü-style song. However, at Norton's advice, Francis slowed down the tempo.

Norton's suggestions were not always welcome, and several instances of advice to add verses and increase track length contributed to the frontman's building frustration. Eventually, Francis took Norton to a record store, where he handed him a copy of a Buddy Holly greatest hits album, in which most of the songs are around two minutes long. He told Norton, "If it's good enough for Buddy Holly ..." In a  Rolling Stone interview, Francis later recalled that "this record is him trying to make us, shall I say, commercial, and us trying to remain somewhat grungy". Production continued until December 12, 1988, with Norton and Haigler adding extra effects, including gated reverb to the mix. The master tapes were then sent for final post-production later that month.

During the recording of Doolittle, tensions between Francis and Deal became visible to band members and the production team. Bickering and standoffs between the two marred the recording sessions and led to increased stress among the band members. John Murphy, Deal's husband at the time, later recalled that, with Doolittle, the band dynamic "went from just all fun to work". Exhaustion from touring and from releasing three records in two years contributed to the friction. This culminated at the end of the US post-Doolittle "Fuck or Fight" tour, where they were too tired to attend the end-of-tour party. Soon afterwards, the band announced that they were taking a break.

Composition

Music 

Doolittle features an eclectic mix of musical styles. While tracks such as "Tame" and "Crackity Jones" are fast and aggressive, and incorporate the band's trademark loud–quiet dynamic, other songs such as "Silver", "I Bleed", and "Here Comes Your Man" reveal a quieter, slower and more melodic temperament. With Doolittle, the band began to incorporate further instruments into their sound; for instance, "Monkey Gone to Heaven" features two violins and two cellos.

"Tame" is based on a three chord formula, including Joey Santiago playing a "Hendrix chord" over the main bass progression. "I Bleed" is melodically simple, and is formed around a single rhythmical repetition. Some songs are influenced by other genres of music; while "Crackity Jones" has a distinctly Spanish sound, and incorporates G and A triads over a C pedal, the song's rhythm guitar, played by Francis, starts with an eighth-note downstroke typical of punk rock music.

Lyrics 
The lyrical themes explored on Doolittle range from the surrealism of "Debaser", to the environmental catastrophe of "Monkey Gone to Heaven". The prostitutes of "Mr. Grieves", "Tame", and "Hey" share space with the Biblical analogies of "Dead" and "Gouge Away". Black Francis often claimed that Doolittle'''s lyrics were words which just "fit together nicely", and that "the point [of the album] is to experience it, to enjoy it, to be entertained by it". Francis wrote all the material for the album with the exception of "Silver", which he co-wrote with Kim Deal.

The album's opening track, "Debaser", references surrealism, a theme that runs throughout the album. "Debaser" alludes to Luis Buñuel and Salvador Dalí's 1929 surrealist film Un Chien Andalou, and the lyric "slicing up eyeballs" refers to an early scene in the film. Surrealism heavily influenced Francis in his college years and throughout his career with the Pixies. In 1989, Francis expressed his interest in surrealism and its influence on his songwriting method to The New York Times by stating "I got into avant-garde movies and Surrealism as an escape from reality. ... To me, Surrealism is totally artificial. I recently read an interview with the director David Lynch who said he had ideas and images but that he didn't know exactly what they meant. That's how I write."

Another of the album's main themes is environmental catastrophe. "Monkey Gone to Heaven" deals with man's destruction of the ocean and "confusion of man's place in the universe". As Francis put it: "On one hand, it's this big organic toilet. Things get flushed and repurified or decomposed and it's this big, dark, mysterious place. It's also a very mythological place where there are octopus's gardens, the Bermuda Triangle, Atlantis, and mermaids." "Monkey Gone to Heaven" is concerned with man's relationship to the divine, a theme shared with "Mr. Grieves".

Two songs on Doolittle are fashioned after Biblical stories: the story of David and Bathsheba in "Dead", and Samson and Delilah in "Gouge Away". Francis' fascination with Biblical themes can be traced back to his teenage years; when he was twelve, he and his parents joined an evangelical church linked to the Assemblies of God. This background was to be an influence on Doolittle, where he referred to the Devil being "six" and God being "seven" in "Monkey Gone to Heaven".

Other songs explored eccentric subjects, such as "Wave of Mutilation", which Francis described as being about "Japanese businessmen doing murder-suicides with their families because they'd failed in business, and they're driving off a pier into the ocean."

The sea and underwater themes of "Wave of Mutilation", which also feature in "Mr. Grieves" and "Monkey Gone to Heaven", are explorations of one arena for man's death and destruction. Ben Sisario points out that the album begins ("Debaser") and ends ("Gouge Away") with songs about violence being done to eyes. "Crackity Jones" covers another offbeat subject: Francis' roommate in his student exchange trip to San Juan, Puerto Rico, whom he described as a "weird psycho gay roommate".Doolittle also references more ostensibly conventional subjects. "La La Love You", sung by the band's drummer, David Lovering, is a love song; although its "first base, second base, third base, home run" break has led to it being described as "a dig at the very idea of a love song". Francis gave it to Lovering to sing, "like a Ringo thing". Lovering initially refused to sing it, but Norton said that he was soon unable to "get him away from the microphone". As well as lead vocals on "La La Love You", Lovering played bass guitar on "Silver", with Deal playing slide guitar; this arrangement did not occur again.

 Packaging and title Doolittle was the first album where Simon Larbalestier, the Pixies' cover photographer, and Vaughan Oliver, the band's cover artist, had access to the lyrics. According to Larbalestier, this "made a fundamental difference".

The surrealist and abstract images throughout the album booklet are linked to the album's content. "Gouge Away" is represented by a picture of a spoon containing hair, laid across a woman's torso; a direct pictorial representation of heroin, with the spoon and the hair being horses. The image "As Loud As Hell" shows "a ringing bell", with a set of teeth; this alludes to the line "it shakes my teeth" in the song "I Bleed". "Walking with the Crustaceans" is a visual representation of the lyrics to "Wave of Mutilation". Larbalestier later commented that he was interested in "early Surrealist stuff" at this time.

During the recording sessions, Whore was discarded as a potential album title, after Oliver changed the cover artwork idea to a monkey and halo cover. Francis later explained his rationale for the move:

Francis then named the album Doolittle, from the "Mr. Grieves" lyric "Pray for a man in the middle / One that talks like Doolittle".

 Release 
In the months following the release of Surfer Rosa, Pixies' management fielded calls from a number of labels. Elektra Records A&R scout Peter Lubin first saw the band in October 1988, when they opened for the Jesus and Mary Chain, and immediately sought to convince the band to sign to his label. Pixies signed to Elektra Records during a UK spring tour in 1989. Elektra followed by releasing a live promotional album, which contained two songs from their forthcoming album—"Debaser" and "Gouge Away"—along with a selection of earlier material.

However, Elektra had not yet attained distribution rights to the band's forthcoming album. 4AD, then a small British independent record label, held worldwide distribution rights to Pixies, but did not have access to distribution outside of the United Kingdom; the band had had to import all its previous records from Europe. Pixies' management sought international distribution, and while negotiations with Elektra and other record companies began in the third quarter of 1988, they were only completed just two weeks before Doolittles release, on April 2, 1989. PolyGram had already secured Canadian distribution rights by that time.

Doolittle was released in the United Kingdom on April 17, 1989, and in the United States the following day. Throughout the States, helped by Elektra's major label status, retail displays were constructed for the record, and "Monkey Gone to Heaven", the first single from the album, was released to radio stations for inclusion on playlists.

 Reissues 
To celebrate the 25th anniversary of the album, 4AD announced that a deluxe edition of the album, titled Doolittle 25, was to be released January 12, 2015,  containing unreleased B-sides, demos, and two full Peel sessions.

On December 9, 2016, a limited Pure Audio Blu-Ray version of the album was released containing a 5.1 surround sound mix of the album by Kevin Vanbergen and a high definition stereo mix by Mobile Fidelity Sound Lab.

 Reception 
Commercial
Doolittles chart performance in the United States was unremarkable, as the album entered the Billboard 200 at number 171. However, with the help of college radio play of "Monkey Gone to Heaven", Doolittle eventually rose to number 98 and spent two weeks in the top 100. In Britain, the record reached number eight on the UK Albums Chart. This chart placing was an unexpected success for the band as their previous two records, Come On Pilgrim and Surfer Rosa, had failed to reach as high on the British charts.

In June 1989, 4AD released "Here Comes Your Man" as the album's second single. It reached number three on the US Modern Rock Tracks chart and number 56 in the UK Singles Chart. It was not the last single from the album: in 1997, "Debaser" was released as a single to promote the Death to the Pixies compilation.

Following its release, Doolittle sold steadily in America, and broke sales of 100,000 after six months. By early 1992, while the band were supporting U2 on their Zoo TV Tour, the album was selling 1,500 copies per week. By the middle of 1993—two years after the release of the band's last album before their initial breakup, Trompe le Monde—Doolittle saw sales average 1,200 copies per week. Doolittle was certified Gold by the Recording Industry Association of America in 1995 and Platinum in 2018.

Ten years after the breakup, Doolittle was still selling between 500 and 1,000 copies a week, and their 2004 reunion tour saw sales creep back up to 1,200 copies per week. At the end of 2005, best estimates put total sales in America at between 800,000 and one million copies. As of 2015, sales in the United States have exceeded 834,000 copies, according to Nielsen SoundScan. 

On May 6, 2019, "Here Comes Your Man" was certified Gold in Canada. On September 20, 2021, "Hey" was certified Gold in Canada.

Critical

Reaction to Doolittle was positive in general, with the album garnering praise from several major music publications. NME writer Edwin Pouncey commented that "the songs on Doolittle have the power to make you literally jump out of your skin with excitement". Q critic Peter Kane said that Doolittles "carefully structured noise and straightforward rhythmic insistence makes perfect sense". Tim Rolston of The Daily Telegraph praised Doolittle as "a scintillating rock'n'roll album" and the Pixies' "finest half-hour so far". Several other publications ran positive reviews of the album, including the British music weekly Record Mirror, The Philadelphia Inquirer, the Los Angeles Times, and the Chicago Tribune. Robert Christgau of The Village Voice wrote, "They're in love and they don't know why—with rock and roll, which is heartening in a time when so many college dropouts have lost touch with the verities". However, he concluded that "getting famous too fast could ruin them", while suggesting the lyrics reflect somewhat of a disconnection with "the outside world".

Some reviewers were more critical. Time Out said that "Gil Norton's toy theatre production makes a drama out of what should have been a crisis". Spin ran a hundred-word review of the album, with critic Joe Levy finding "the insanity less surreal and more silly, and the songs themselves more like songs and less like adventures". Rolling Stone published "a tentative endorsement" of Doolittle, rating it three and a half stars; reviewer Chris Mundy concluded, "The emphasis on more textured production has in no way taken away from the band's intensity. Francis is at all times in command of the album, quietly stringing us along before turning on us and screaming for attention. It's about time everyone started taking notice." Doolittle appeared on several end-of-year "Best Album" lists; both Rolling Stone and The Village Voice placed the album tenth, and independent music magazines Sounds and Melody Maker both ranked the album as the second-best of the year. NME also ranked the album highly, placing it fourth in their end-of-year list.

 Legacy 

The sudden loud to quiet dynamic present on Doolittle, most notably in "Tame", has been very influential on alternative rock. After writing "Smells Like Teen Spirit", both Kurt Cobain and Krist Novoselic of Nirvana thought: "this really sounds like the Pixies. People are really going to nail us for this." Producer Gil Norton usually receives much credit for the album's dynamic, and is sought by bands seeking a similar sound. The Smashing Pumpkins guitarist James Iha described Doolittle as less raw than Surfer Rosa but "more listenable" and "Here Comes Your Man" as a "classic pop record". Fellow alternative musician PJ Harvey was "in awe" of "I Bleed" and "Tame", and described Francis's writing as "amazing".  The album was also included in the book 1001 Albums You Must Hear Before You Die. PopMatters included it in their list of the "12 Essential 1980s Alternative Rock Albums" saying, "Doolittle, captured the musicians at the top of their game when it was released in 1989."

 Accolades 
A range of music magazines have since acclaimed Doolittle as one of the quintessential alternative rock albums of the 1980s. Rolling Stone, reviewing Doolittle again in 2002, gave the album a maximum score of five stars, remarking that it laid the "groundwork for Nineties rock". Doolittle has received a number of international accolades and is consistently noted as one of the best albums of the 1980s in any genre.

The information regarding accolades attributed to Doolittle is taken from AcclaimedMusic.net.

(*) designates unordered lists.

 Track listing 
All tracks were written by Black Francis, except where noted.

 Doolittle 25 bonus discs 

Disc 2 / LP 2 – B-sides & Peel Sessions

All tracks previously released unless otherwise indicated.

Disc 3 / LP 3 (tracks 1-18) – Demos

All tracks previously unreleased unless otherwise indicated.

 Personnel Pixies Black Francis – vocals, guitar
 Kim Deal – bass guitar, vocals, acoustic slide guitar ("Silver")
 Joey Santiago – lead guitar, backing vocals
 David Lovering – drums, lead vocal ("La La Love You"), bass guitar ("Silver")Additional musicians Karen Karlsrud – violin ("Monkey Gone to Heaven")
 Corine Metter – violin ("Monkey Gone to Heaven")
 Arthur Fiacco – cello ("Monkey Gone to Heaven")
 Ann Rorich – cello ("Monkey Gone to Heaven")Technical Gil Norton – producer, engineer
 Dave Snider – assistant engineer
 Matt Lane – assistant engineer
 Steve Haigler – mixing
 Vaughan Oliver – art direction, design
 Simon Larbalestier – photography
 Chris Bigg – calligraphy

 Chart performance AlbumSingles'Certifications and sales

 References 
 Citations 

 Works cited 
 Frank, Josh; Ganz, Caryn. Fool the World: The Oral History of a Band Called Pixies. Virgin Books, 2005. .
 Sisario, Ben. Doolittle ''. Continuum, 2006. .

External links 

 Doolittle (Adobe Flash) at Radio3Net (streamed copy where licensed)
 Doolittle at Last.fm
 Doolittle at Google Music

1989 albums
4AD albums
Albums produced by Gil Norton
Elektra Records albums
Noise pop albums
Pixies (band) albums
PolyGram albums
Punk rock albums by American artists
Grunge albums